Isabella Victoria Sola Flanigan (born February 22, 2005) is a footballer who plays as a forward for the Montverde Eagles. Born in the United States, she represents the Philippines women's national team.

Early life
Flanigan was born in Fairmont, West Virginia, United States. Her mother is Filipina. She has attended the Montverde Academy where she played for the school's girls' football (soccer) team.

International career

Philippines U18
Flanigan was included in the 27-player line up of the Philippines U18 for the 2022 AFF U-18 Women's Championship in Palembang, Indonesia. 

She made her debut for Philippines U18 in a 4–0 defeat against Australia U18. She scored her first goal for the Philippines U18 in a 2-1 defeat against Malaysia U18.

Philippines
Flanigan represented the Philippines at the 2022 AFC Women's Asian Cup.

International goals
Scores and results list the Philippines' goal tally first.

Honours

International

Philippines
Southeast Asian Games third place: 2021
AFF Women's Championship: 2022

References

External links

2005 births
Living people
Citizens of the Philippines through descent
Filipino women's footballers
Women's association football defenders
Philippines women's international footballers
Sportspeople from Fairmont, West Virginia
Soccer players from West Virginia
American women's soccer players
American sportspeople of Filipino descent
Southeast Asian Games bronze medalists for the Philippines
Southeast Asian Games medalists in football
Competitors at the 2021 Southeast Asian Games